The Blue Hen Conference is a high school sports conference comprising public schools in New Castle County, Delaware. It is subdivided by size into two flights:

Flight A 
Alexis I. duPont High School
Appoquinimink High School

Concord High School
Delcastle Technical High School
Glasgow High School
Middletown High School
Mount Pleasant High School
William Penn High School

Flight B 
Brandywine High School
Christiana High School
John Dickinson High School
Hodgson Vo-Tech High School
Howard High School of Technology
St. Georges Technical High School
Thomas McKean High School
Newark High School

References

Delaware high school sports conferences
Education in New Castle County, Delaware